MailXaminer is a digital forensic program built and designed to examine email messages from both web & Desktop Application based email clients. The application is being developed by SysTools, with the slogan ‘Simplifying Email Forensics’. The software product name derived from a combination of ‘Mail’ and ‘Examiner’, denoting it as a platform to examine emails for forensic purposes.

The email forensic tool lets cybercrime investigators to analyze evidence from different data items such as emails, contacts, calendars, etc. from different email applications. MailXaminer first loads messages from the chosen email file and arranges them hierarchically for the purpose of evidence analysis and data extraction in a diligent manner. The programming of the application provides carving out of deleted evidence or evidence from damaged sources in cases of evidence spoliation. Post analysis, the software generates output generation in court admissible digital formats (e.g. Concordance, Adobe PDF).

Overview

SysTools is the official developer of MailXaminer that launched its first release on December 1, 2013. The software developed by high-skilled professionals underwent a number of version updates and the recently updated version 4.9.3 was launched 3 Jan, 2020 with additional advanced features. This includes Word Cloud, Timeline Analysis, link analysis, entity analysis, option to add bulk evidential files through CSV, skin tone analysis, schedule IMAP accounts backup for web-based accounts and much more.

The software has helped innumerable forensic investigators to save their valuable time while analyzing the email data since its launch. Support for forensic disk image , Optical character recognition format, Skype Database analysis is also added to the application since one of its upgrades.  The software can analyze and examine email file formats from the image files, owing to the email examination theme of the application. As of now, the application is serving legal departments, legal departments, law enforcement agencies, government sectors, and more such sectors with the requirement of the investigation of email data.

 Examine image content with Advanced OCR capabilities. 
 Find evidence from the bulk of electronic data through Robust Forensic Keyword Search.
 Track connection between the suspects using Advanced Intelligent Link Analysis.
 Apply Skin Tone Analysis to track obscene images and videos in email. 
 Carry out forensic analysis on Skype data such as Calls, Chats, etc.
 Tag Emails to differentiate them as per their importance & identify the exact email that relates to the case.
 Non-technical, semi-skilled, and technical users can easily use the tool.
 Search Terabytes of data from different file formats such as PST, OST, EDB, MBOX, & more.
 Supports 80+ Email Clients like Gmail, Office 365, iCloud, Rackspace, Hotmail, etc.

MailXaminer, The Only Choice Of Users When it Comes to Email Investigation. MailXaminer is Also Available in Team Version Now Seamlessly Collaborate on Investigations!

See also
List of Digital Forensics Tools
Forensic Search
Computer Forensics

References

External links
 MailXaminer Product page
 forensicswiki MailXaminer
 Software links for Forensics Investigative Tasks
 MailXaminer
 SysTools OST to PST Converter

Computer forensics
Digital forensics software